Stelis elegans Luer & R.Vásquez is a species of flowering plant in the family Orchidaceae, native to Bolivia and Ecuador. It was first described in 1981. Stelis elegans (Kunth) Pridgeon & M.W.Chase is a synonym of Stelis roseopunctata.

References

elegans
Flora of Bolivia
Flora of Ecuador
Plants described in 1981